The Blanc de Popielno (Literally "White of Popielno"), also known as the Popielno White or the , is a breed of domestic rabbit developed for meat production. Originating in 1950 in Chorzelów, the breed was further refined in the Polish village of Popielno.

See also

List of rabbit breeds

References

Rabbit breeds